Cornish Rebellion may refer to:

 Cornish Rebellion of 1497
 Cornish Rebellion of 1549